Sara Veralucia Guerrero Chavarria is a Guatemalan beauty pageant titleholder who was crowned as Miss Earth Guatemala 2015 and Guatemala's representative in Miss Earth 2015.

Pageantry

Miss International 2013
Sara represented her country at Miss International 2013 pageant in Japan. However, as the pageant concluded, she was not able to penetrate the semifinals. 

The pageant was won by Bea Santiago of the Philippines.

Miss Earth 2015
Being appointed as Miss Earth Guatemala for 2015, Sara is Guatemala's representative to be Miss Earth 2015 and would try to succeed Jamie Herrell as the next Miss Earth.

References

Miss Earth 2015 contestants
1996 births
Living people
Miss Guatemala winners
Miss International 2013 delegates
People from Guatemala City